Carlos Tuimavave (born 10 January 1992) is a Samoa international rugby league footballer who plays as a  or  for Hull F.C. in the Super League. 

He previously played for the New Zealand Warriors and the Newcastle Knights in the NRL.

Background
Also see :Category:Tuimavave family.

Tuimavave was born in Auckland, New Zealand, and is of Samoan and European descent.

He played his junior football for the Mount Wellington Warriors while attending St. Patricks School and Sacred Heart College, both in east Auckland.

Tuimavave is a cousin of former New Zealand Warriors, Newcastle Knights and Hull Kingston Rovers player, Evarn Tuimavave, and nephew of former New Zealand and Samoan internationals, Tony Tuimavave and Paddy Tuimavave.

Playing career

Early career
When he was 16, Tuimavave moved to Sydney, Australia after being signed by the Canterbury-Bankstown Bulldogs. Becoming homesick, he was offered the chance to join the New Zealand Warriors NYC squad in 2010.

From 2010 to 2012, he played for the Warriors' NYC team, playing in both the Warriors' 2010 and 2011 Grand Final victories. Forming a halves partnership with Shaun Johnson, Tuimavave was named the Man of the Match in the 2010 Grand Final and also won the Warriors' Young NYC Player of the Year award. In October 2010, he played for the Junior Kiwis against the Junior Kangaroos. On 30 August 2011, he was named at five-eighth in the 2011 NYC Team of the Year. On 16 October 2011, he captained the Junior Kiwis. In 2012, he became the club's sixth player to appear in 50 NYC matches.

2012
In Round 22 of the 2012 NRL season, Tuimavave made his NRL debut for the Warriors against the Cronulla-Sutherland Sharks, becoming the 177th player to play for the Warriors. He came on the field after 20 minutes filling in for the injured five-eighth, James Maloney. On 21 August 2012, he was named at five-eighth in the 2012 NYC Team of the Year. On 13 October 2012, he played for the Junior Kiwis against the Junior Kangaroos for the third time. At the end of 2012, he was named one of the top ten young players of 2012 in an article by Lifestyle Uncut.

2013
In 2013, Tuimavave elected to play for Samoa at senior level and made his international debut in their Pacific Rugby League International clash against Tonga in Penrith.

2014
In May 2014, Tuimavave played for Samoa in the 2014 Pacific Rugby League International. He scored a try in Samoa's 32-16 test-match win. In June 2014, he signed a 2-year contract with the Newcastle Knights starting in 2015. On 8 September 2014, he was named in the Samoa train-on squad for the 2014 Four Nations, but didn't make the final 24-man squad.

2015
On 2 May, Tuimavave played for Samoa against Tonga in the 2015 Polynesian Cup. In Round 12 of the 2015 NRL season, he made his Knights debut against his former club, the New Zealand Warriors. On 25 July, it was confirmed that Tuimavave would be heading off to play in England next season for Super League side Hull F.C. On 27 September, he played in the Knights' 2015 New South Wales Cup Grand Final win over the Wyong Roos.

2016
Tuimavave was given the number 3 shirt for the Hull F.C. side in the 2016 season. He began his Hull FC career in a 60-20 friendly win over the Hull Kingston Rovers. 

On 27 August, he would go on to make history as he played in the Challenge Cup Final for Hull F.C. against Warrington Wolves. Hull, having never won at Wembley Stadium in 8 attempts had to come back from 10-0 down with 20 minutes to go to win the game 12-10, giving him his first major trophy and going down in the history books as part of the first Hull team to win at Wembley.

2017
On 26 August 2017, Tuimavave won the Challenge Cup for a second year in a row in Hull's 18-14 win over the Wigan Warriors at Wembley Stadium.

2018
Tuimavave played 18 games in the 2018 Super League season as Hull F.C. finished sixth on the table.

2019
Tuimavave played 23 games for Hull F.C. in the 2019 Super League season as the club finished sixth and missed the playoffs.

2020
Tuimavave played 17 games for Hull F.C. in the 2020 Super League season as the club got to within one game of the grand final.
At the end of the 2020 season, Tuimavave won Hull FC's Player of the Year award, as well as scooping the Try of the Season for his effort against St Helens in Round 3.

2021
Tuimavave played 20 games for Hull F.C. and scored nine tries in the 2021 Super League season which saw the club finish 8th on the table and miss out on the playoffs.

2022
Tuimavave played a total of eight games for Hull F.C. in the 2022 Super League season which saw the club finish 9th on the table.

Honours

Newcastle Knights

New South Wales Cup: (1) 2015

Hull FC

Challenge Cup: (2) 2016, 2017

References

External links

Hull F.C. profile
Newcastle Knights profile
SL profile

1992 births
Living people
Hull F.C. captains
Hull F.C. players
Junior Kiwis players
Mount Wellington Warriors players
New Zealand sportspeople of Samoan descent
New Zealand rugby league players
New Zealand Warriors players
Newcastle Knights players
People educated at Sacred Heart College, Auckland
Rugby league centres
Rugby league five-eighths
Rugby league fullbacks
Rugby league players from Auckland
Samoa national rugby league team players
Samoan rugby league players
Samoan sportspeople
Carlos